Ghost in the Invisible Bikini is a 1966 American fantasy comedy film. It is the seventh and last of American International Pictures' beach party films. The film features the cast cavorting in and around a haunted house and the adjacent swimming pool. No beach appears in the film.

Besides the usual bikini-clad cast, random singing, silly plot line, musical guests, and ridiculous chases and fight scenes, the continuity linking this to the other beach films is the Rat Pack motorcycle gang led by Eric Von Zipper (Harvey Lembeck), as well as the appearance of previous beach party alumni Tommy Kirk, Deborah Walley, Bobbi Shaw, Jesse White, Aron Kincaid, Quinn O'Hara and Boris Karloff.

Pop singer Nancy Sinatra, who was on the rise at the time just before the film was released, has a supporting role and performs one song written for the film; and The Bobby Fuller Four appear as themselves and sing two songs. Claudia Martin, daughter of Dean Martin, co-stars in the film as Lulu. The Italian starlet Piccola Pupa appears as herself and sings a song.

Plot
The ghost of recently dead Mr. Hiram Stokeley (Boris Karloff) finds that he has 24 hours to perform one good deed to get into Heaven.  He enlists the help of his long-dead girlfriend, Cecily, to stop his lawyer, Reginald Ripper (Basil Rathbone), and a henchman from claiming the estate for themselves.  The real heirs, Chuck, Lili, Hiram's cousin Myrtle, and her son bring their beach party friends to the mansion for a pool party while Reginald Ripper also employs his daughter Sinistra, and J. Sinister Hulk's slow-witted associates Chicken Feather and Yolanda to help them terrorize the teens, while dopey biker Eric Von Zipper and his Malibu Rat Pack bikers also get involved in pursuing Yolanda for a share of the Stokely estate.

Principal cast

 Tommy Kirk as Chuck Phillips
 Deborah Walley as Lili Morton
 Aron Kincaid as Bobby
 Quinn O'Hara as Sinistra Ripper
 Jesse White as J. Sinister Hulk
 Nancy Sinatra as Vicki
 Claudia Martin as Lulu
 Francis X. Bushman as Malcolm
 Benny Rubin as Chicken Feather
 Bobbi Shaw as Princess Yolanda
 George Barrows as Monstro
 Basil Rathbone as Reginald Ripper
 Patsy Kelly as Myrtle Forbush
 Boris Karloff as Hiram Stokely
 Susan Hart as Cecily the Ghost
 Piccola Pupa as Piccola
 Luree Holmes as Luree
 Ed Garner as Ed
 Frank Alesia as Frank

The Rat Pack
 Harvey Lembeck as Eric Von Zipper
 Andy Romano as J.D.
 Alberta Nelson as Puss
 Myrna Ross as Boots
 Jerry Brutsche as Jerome
 Bob Harvey as Bobby
 Sam Page as Chauncey
 John Macchia as Joey
 Allen Fife as Beard

Production notes

Development
The project originated as Pajama Party in a Haunted House being first announced by AIP in January 1965. It was part of a line up of Beach Party-linked projects from the studio, the others including Beach Blanket Bingo, How to Stuff a Wild Bikini, Ski Party, Sergeant Deadhead, The Chase Jet Set Party, and a Beach Party TV series. (The last two of those announced were never made.)

It was also known in development as The Girl in the Glass Bikini and was originally to star Annette Funicello and Frankie Avalon, and be directed by William Asher. The title of Girl in the Glass Bikini can be seen in the promo in the end credits for Dr. Goldfoot and the Bikini Machine,  an AIP spy spoof loosely affiliated with the Beach Party series (with "beach" alumni Avalon, Walley, Dwayne Hickman, and Susan Hart).

By June 1965, Don Weis was announced as director. He had made Pajama Party for AIP, and did it under a two-picture deal with the studio. Louis M. Heyward, who had also worked on Pajama Party, wrote the script.

During filming, the movie was also called Bikini Party in a Haunted House.

Casting
Although Avalon and Funicello had been announced as the stars originally, neither appeared in the final film (it remains the only movie in the series to not feature either.) Walley signed in June 1965, and was soon followed by Nancy Sinatra and Claudia Martin. Beach Party regulars Jody McCrea, Harvey Lembeck and John Ashley were also originally announced in the cast with Buster Keaton signing to reprise his role as a comic Indian.

Keaton bowed out, due to illness (decd. February 1966) and his role was taken by Ben Rubin. Ashley and McCrea did not appear in the final film, the male leads being played by Tommy Kirk and Aron Kincaid, both of whom had worked for AIP before.

Other veteran actors who appeared were Francis X. Bushman, Basil Rathbone and Patsy Kelly. The movie was reportedly Bushman's 435th. Elsa Lanchester was originally announced to be playing a small role but did not appear in the final film.

Actress and singer Piccola Pupa was a 13-year-old discovery of Danny Thomas. The movie marked her film debut.

Filming
The shoot began in September 1965.

Aron Kincaid, who was forced to participate in the film under his long-term contract with AIP, was supposed to perform two musical numbers, but these scenes were dropped. After filming was completed, a number of the cast went to the Golden Oak Ranch to film the opening number, Bikini Party in a Haunted House, sung by Kincaid and Piccola Pupa.

The stunt scene of Eric Von Zipper crashing his motorcycle into a pond was used again in the first Billy Jack film, The Born Losers (1967), also produced by AIP.

Addition of Karloff/Hart sequences
James H. Nicholson and Samuel Z. Arkoff of AIP were not happy with the original cut of the film and subsequently ordered reshoots several weeks after the completion of principal photography, including addition of a new plot involving an old man who has to perform a good deed in order to gain eternal youth, and a sexy ghost in an invisible bikini who helps him. The old man was played by Boris Karloff and the ghost by Nicholson's wife Susan Hart. The movie was retitled Ghost in the Invisible Bikini.

Hart shot her scenes wearing a blonde wig and black velvet bathing suit, shot against a black velvet backdrop. They were directed by editor Ronnie Sinclair. Hart worked for two weeks on her own, then for a week with Boris Karloff. Karloff's scenes were all filmed in a one-room mausoleum set on a separate soundstage. For his scenes, Karloff is clearly standing in a bottomless coffin, rather than sitting up in it, a necessity given his chronic back problems and leg brace. Neither Hart or Karloff worked with any members of the original cast; their scenes were edited into the existing footage.

Music
Les Baxter composed and conducted the musical score. Al Simms was the musical supervisor, and Albert Harris composed some additional music and served as the film's orchestrator.

Guy Hemric and Jerry Styner wrote five songs that appear in the film:
 "Geronimo" performed by Nancy Sinatra
 "Don't Try to Fight It Baby" performed by Quinn O'Hara
 "Stand Up and Fight" performed by Piccola Pupa
 "Swing A-Ma Thing" performed by The Bobby Fuller Four
 "Make the Music Pretty" performed by The Bobby Fuller Four

Reception
The film was released in April 1966.

Critical
Margaret Harford of the Los Angeles Times said the film "has little to distinguish itself from its predecessors beyond the rumour that this beach party romp in a haunted house will be the last in AIP's long proliferating series", further noting, "Old timers give the picture some class." Variety wrote, "All in all, a good try but short on script and inspiration."

Box office
The film's theatrical releases was a commercial disappointment. Vincent Canby in the New York Times described it as "a flop". However, it did gross 1.5 million against a budget of $600,000.  AIP made no further Beach Party films, as the genre was changing and grew into drag racing and motorcycle-themed storylines.

Philip Bent, who had a small role, died in a plane crash in July 1966 shortly after the film's release. In the same month, Bobby Fuller was also found dead near his home in LA.

DVD
Under its 'Midnite Movie' line, Ghost in the Invisible Bikini was released on Region 1 DVD February 15, 2005 by MGM Home Entertainment. Ghost of Dragstrip Hollow was on Side Two of the disc, emulating AIP's theatrical release double features of the 1960s.

See also
 List of American films of 1966

References

External links
 
 
 
 
 The Ghost in the Invisible Bikini at Brian's Drive in Theatre

1966 films
1960s fantasy comedy films
1960s teen films
American International Pictures films
American sequel films
American fantasy comedy films
1960s English-language films
Beach party films
Films directed by Don Weis
Films scored by Les Baxter
Films set in California
American ghost films
American haunted house films
Bikinis
1966 comedy films
1960s American films